Mozilla Thunderbird was originally launched as Minotaur, shortly after Phoenix (the original name for Mozilla Firefox); the project failed to gain momentum. With the success of the Mozilla Firefox, however, demand increased for a mail client to go with it, and the work on Minotaur was revived under the new name of Thunderbird, and migrated to the new toolkit developed by the Firefox team.

Early beginnings: A simple email and news client

Significant work on Thunderbird restarted with the announcement that from version 1.5 onwards the main Mozilla suite would be designed around separate applications using this then new toolkit. This contrasted with the previous all-in-one approach, hopefully leading to more efficient and maintainable code, as well as allowing users to mix and match the Mozilla applications with alternatives.

The original Thunderbird logo was just a modified Firebird logo, with a simple shifting of hue value from red to blue. In 2004, together with the change of Firefox's visual identity by Jon Hicks, a more professional logo that is currently in use was introduced.

Release history

Color chart

Current supported release

Current test releases

Notes

Release compatibility

Development history
On 23 December 2004, the Project Lightning was announced for tightly integrating calendar functionality (scheduling, tasks, etc.) into Thunderbird. Lightning is just a project name, not a product name. Lightning 0.1 was released on 14 March 2006. The latest version of Lightning was 6.2.6.1, released on March 25, 2019 for Thunderbird 68.x. Since Thunderbird 78 Lightning is no longer a separate extension but an internal part of Thunderbird itself.

On 11 October 2006, Qualcomm and the Mozilla Foundation announced that "future versions of Eudora will be based upon the same technology platform as the open source Mozilla Thunderbird email program." The project is code-named Penelope. An unofficial Eudora/Penelope forum is accessible via web or newsreader.

On 26 July 2007, the Mozilla Foundation announced that Thunderbird would be developed by an independent organization, because the Mozilla Corporation (the for profit portion of Mozilla) is focusing on Mozilla Firefox development. This change was made in order to stimulate development in Thunderbird, which was being neglected during the Mozilla focus on Firefox.

On 17 September 2007, the Mozilla Foundation announced the funding of a new internet communications initiative with Dr. David Ascher of ActiveState. The purpose of this initiative is "to develop Internet communications software based on the Thunderbird product, code and brand".

On 19 February 2008, Mozilla Messaging started operations as a subsidiary of the Mozilla Foundation responsible for the development of email and similar communications. Its initial focus was on the next major version, Thunderbird 3.0, which was released on 8 December 2009.

On 6 July 2012, the Mozilla Foundation announced that while they will no longer be focused on innovations for Thunderbird, they would provide support until the second half of 2013. In addition, future Thunderbird development will be transitioned to a community-driven model.

See also

 History of Mozilla Application Suite
 History of Free Software

Notes

External links
 Mozilla release schedule for recent and upcoming versions of Thunderbird and Firefox
 Thunderbird release notes for each version
 Downloadable versions of Thunderbird from OSUOSL
 The Rumbling Edge: Thunderbird release changelogs
 Jon Hicks describing the process of making Mozilla Thunderbird's logo

Mozilla Thunderbird
Thunderbird
Mozilla Thunderbird
Mozilla Thunderbird